Excursion Train (French: Train de plaisir) is a 1936 French romantic comedy film directed by Léo Joannon and starring Frédéric Duvallès, José Noguéro and Germaine Roger.

Synopsis
The manager of a floor at a Paris department store plans to go away to the sea with one of the saleswoman. He tells his wife that he needs to catch the excursion train in order to attend the funeral of his aunt.

Cast
 Frédéric Duvallès as Prosper Biscoton 
 José Noguéro as Verdurin  
 Germaine Roger as Marguerite  
 Raymond Cordy as Pigeonnet  
 Louis Baron fils as Me Picquois 
 Paul Clerget as Le chef de train  
 Emile Saulieu 
 Georges Bever as Porteur 
 Robert Seller as Un voyageur  
 Paul Asselin 
 Paul Grail as Un voyageur  
 Paul Demange as Un employé  
 Félix Oudart as Inspecteur Plouf  
 Saturnin Fabre as M. Bring  
 Madeleine Guitty as Tante Ursule  
 Jeanne Fusier-Gir as Mlle Culpas  
 Pauline Carton as La concierge  
 Germaine Brière as Une voyageuse  
 Jeanne Rémy as Mme Bring  
 Marcelle Yrven as Mme Pigeonnet  
 Yvonne Yma as La télégraphiste  
 Junie Astor as La fleuriste  
 Marguerite Moreno as Mme Biscoton 
 Paul Barge

References

Bibliography 
 Dayna Oscherwitz & MaryEllen Higgins. The A to Z of French Cinema. Scarecrow Press, 2009.

External links 
 

1936 films
1930s French-language films
Films directed by Léo Joannon
French romantic comedy films
1936 romantic comedy films
Films scored by Casimir Oberfeld
French black-and-white films
1930s French films
Films set in Paris